Leopold Fischer may refer to:

Agehananda Bharati (1923–1991), Hindu monk and Sanskritist, born under the name Leopold Fischer
Leopold Heinrich Fischer (1817–1866), German zoologist and mineralogist
Leo Fischer (1897–1970), sports editor
Leopold Fischer (photographer), Austrian police officer and photographer